The 1876 United States presidential election in Connecticut took place on November 7, 1876, as part of the 1876 United States presidential election. Voters chose six representatives, or electors to the Electoral College, who voted for president and vice president.

Connecticut voted for the Democratic nominee, Samuel J. Tilden, over the Republican nominee, Rutherford B. Hayes. Tilden won the state by a narrow margin of 2.37%. It was the first time since 1852 that a Democratic presidential candidate won Connecticut. Likewise, this was the first election in which a Republican presidential candidate lost Connecticut. 

As of 2020, this is the most recent presidential election in which the Democratic nominee carried the town of Hartland.

Results

See also
 United States presidential elections in Connecticut

References

Connecticut
1876
1876 Connecticut elections